Verkhny Lyubazh is a rural locality and the administrative center of Verkhnelyubazhsky Selsoviet Rural Settlement, Fatezhsky District, Kursk Oblast, Russia. Population:

Geography 
The village is located on the Lyubazh River (a right tributary of the Zhelen in the basin of the Svapa), 107 km from the Russia–Ukraine border, 58 km north-west of Kursk, 13.5 km north of the district center – the town Fatezh.

 Climate
Verkhny Lyubazh has a warm-summer humid continental climate (Dfb in the Köppen climate classification).

Transport 
Verkhny Lyubazh is located on the federal route  Crimea Highway as part of the European route E105, 28 km from the route  (Trosna – M3 highway), 93 km from the route  Ukraine Highway as part of the European route E101, 1.5 km from the road of regional importance  (Verkhny Lyubazh – Ponyri), 12.5 km from the road  (Fatezh – Dmitriyev), 26 km from the road  (A-142 – 38K-038), 1.5 km from the road  (M2 Crimea Highway – Igino – 38K-035), 1.5 km from the road of intermunicipal significance  (M2 "Crimea Highway" – Zherdevo), 27 km from the nearest railway halt 34 km (railway line Arbuzovo – Luzhki-Orlovskiye).

The rural locality is situated 60 km from Kursk Vostochny Airport, 181 km from Belgorod International Airport and 237 km from Voronezh Peter the Great Airport.

References

Notes

Sources

Rural localities in Fatezhsky District